James Gilchrist may refer to:

Jim Gilchrist (born 1949), American activist and co-founder, along with Chris Simcox, of the Minuteman Project Inc.
James W. Gilchrist (born 1965), Maryland politician
James Gilchrist (tenor), British tenor
James Gordon Gilchrist (born 1928), Canadian Member of Parliament
James Gilchrist (tennis) (1919–2004), Australian tennis player